KZLL-LD, virtual channel 39 (UHF digital channel 24), is a low-powered NTD America-affiliated television station serving Tulsa, Oklahoma, United States that is licensed to Joplin, Missouri. The station is owned by Sunrise, Florida-based DTV America Corporation.

Digital channels
The station's digital signal is multiplexed:

References

External links

 
 

Innovate Corp.
Low-power television stations in the United States
ZLL-LD
Television channels and stations established in 2015
2015 establishments in Oklahoma
Twist (TV network) affiliates
True Crime Network affiliates